The United States Collegiate Athletic Association (USCAA) is a national organization for the intercollegiate athletic programs of 72 mostly small colleges, including community/junior colleges, across the United States. The USCAA holds 15 national championships and 2 national invitationals annually.

History 
In , the USCAA was founded as the National Little College Athletic Association (NLCAA), primarily to sponsor a national basketball tournament for small colleges and junior colleges.

In the 1970s and through the 1980s, as the NLCAA, the USCAA began adding more sports.

In 1989, the NLCAA changed its name to the National Small College Athletic Association (NSCAA).

In 2001, the USCAA adopted its current name.

Membership

Sports
The USCAA sanctions competition in eight men's and seven women's sports:

Post–season national championships are held in all sports except football, which has few participating teams.

Fall
 Men's football
 Men's and women's golf
 Men's and women's cross country running
 Men's and women's soccer (Division I and II)
 Women's volleyball (Division I and II)

Winter
 Men's and women's indoor track and field
 Men's and women's basketball (Division I and II)
 Men's wrestling

Spring
 Men's and women's track and field
 Men's baseball
 Women's softball

Conferences
 Eastern Metro Athletic Conference
 Eastern States Athletic Conference
 Hudson Valley Intercollegiate Athletic Conference
 Penn State University Athletic Conference
 Yankee Small College Conference

Former conferences
 Ohio Collegiate Athletic Conference

Champions

Men's cross country
 1971 Albany College of Pharmacy (NY)
 1972 Albany College of Pharmacy (NY)
 1973 Brewer State College (AL)
 1974 University of South Carolina-Spartanburg
 1975 Ambassador College (TX)
 1976 Ambassador College (TX)
 1977 Florida College
 1978 Florida College
 1979 Dr. Martin Luther College (MN)
 1980 (Not available)
 1981 Southern Union College
 1982 Southern Union College
 1983-1993 (Not available)
 1994 Diné College
 1995 Diné College
 1996 Unity College (ME)
 1997-1999 (Not available)
 2000 Diné College
 2001-2003 (Not available)
 2004 Principia College
 2005 Diné College
 2006 Diné College
 2007 Diné College
 2008 Diné College
 2009 Diné College
 2010 Spalding University
 2011 SUNY-ESF
 2012 SUNY-ESF
 2013 SUNY-ESF
 2014 SUNY-ESF
 2015 Berea College
 2016 SUNY Delhi
 2017 SUNY Delhi
 2018 SUNY Delhi
 2019 SUNY Delhi
 2020 No tournament
 2021 SUNY ESF
 2022 SUNY ESF

Women's cross country
 1981 Brewer State College (AL)
 1982 Alice Lloyd College (KY)
 1983-1994 (Not available)
 1995 Diné College (AZ)
 1996 Unity College (ME)
 1997 (Not available)
 1998 Southern Virginia University
 1999 (Not available)
 2000 Warren Wilson College
 2001 Southern Virginia University
 2002 Southern Virginia University
 2003 Southern Virginia University
 2004 Southern Virginia University
 2005 Southern Virginia University
 2006 Southern Virginia University
 2007 Southern Virginia University
 2008 Diné College
 2009 Saint Mary-of-the-Woods College
 2010 Saint Mary-of-the-Woods College
 2011 Southern Virginia University
 2012 Southern Virginia University
 2013 Daemen College
 2014 Diné College
 2015 Berea College
 2016 Cleary University
 2017 Cleary University
 2018 SUNY-ESF
 2019 Saint Mary-of-the-Woods College
 2020 No tournament
 2021 SUNY ESF
 2022 SUNY ESF

Men's track and field 
 2022 University of Maine at Fort Kent

Women's track and field 
 2022 University of Maine at Fort Kent

Men's soccer
 1977 St. Paul Bible College
 1978 St. Paul Bible College
 1979 St. Paul Bible College
 1980 Mount Senario College (WI)
 1981 Concordia College (MN)
 1982 Blackburn College (IL)
 1983 Cardinal Newman College (MO)
 1984 Blackburn College
 1985 Marycrest College (IA)
 1986 Fontbonne College (MO)
 1987 Central College (KS)
 1988 St. Scholastica College (MN)
 1989 St. Scholastica College (MN)
 1990 York College (NE)
 1991 Northland College (WI)
 1992 York College
 1993 Martin Methodist College
 1994 Sue Bennett College (KY)
 1995 Centenary College of New Jersey
 1996 Michigan Christian College
 1997 Kansas Wesleyan University
 1998 Kansas Wesleyan University
 1999 Kansas Wesleyan University
 2000 Southern Virginia University
 2001 Southern Virginia University
 2002 University of Dallas
 2003 UT Tyler
 2004 Robert Morris University - Lake County
 2005 Bluefield College
 2006 Rochester College
 2007 Robert Morris University - Lake County
 2008 Briarcliffe College
 2009 Concordia College - Selma, Alabama
 2010 University of Maine at Fort Kent
 2011 Lindenwood University – Belleville
 2012 Briarcliffe College
 2013 West Virginia University Institute of Technology
 2014 West Virginia University Institute of Technology
 2015 University of Maine Fort Kent
 2016 University of Maine Fort Kent
 2017 Florida National University

Men's Division I soccer
 2018 Florida National University
 2019 Bryant & Stratton College Syracuse
 2020 No tournament
 2021 Bryant & Stratton College Syracuse
 2022 University of Maine Fort Kent

Men's Division II soccer
 2018 Penn State Brandywine
 2019 Berkeley College (NY)
 2020 No tournament
 2021 Penn State Brandywine
 2022 Johnson & Wales University (NC)

Women's soccer
 1997 St. Gregory's University (OK)
 1998 Southern Virginia College
 1999 Southern Virginia College
 2000 Huntingdon College (OR)
 2001 University of Dallas
 2002 University of Dallas
 2003 University of Dallas
 2004 Webber International University
 2005 Southern Virginia University
 2006 Southern Virginia University
 2007 Robert Morris - Springfield
 2008 Southern Virginia University
 2009 Marygrove College
 2010 University of Maine at Fort Kent
 2011 University of Maine Fort Kent
 2012 Daemen College
 2013 University of Maine Fort Kent
 2014 University of Maine Fort Kent
 2015 University of Maine Fort Kent
 2016 University of Maine Fort Kent
 2017 University of Maine Fort Kent

Women's Division I soccer
 2018 Cleary University
 2019 University of Maine Fort Kent
 2020 No tournament
 2021 Bryant & Stratton College Syracuse
 2022 University of Maine Fort Kent

Women's Division II soccer
 2018 University of Cincinnati Clermont College
 2019 Cincinnati Clermont
 2020 No tournament
 2021 SUNY ESF
 2022 Albany College of Pharmacy and Health Sciences

Women's volleyball
 1980 Jackson Baptist College (OR)
 1981 (not available)
 1982 Northland College (WI)
 1983 College of St. Scholastica (MN)
 1984 College of St. Scholastica
 1985 Dr. Martin Luther College
 1986 Dr. Martin Luther College
 1987 Dr. Martin Luther College
 1988 College of St. Scholastica
 1989 Northland College
 1990 Nazareth College (MI)
 1991 Concordia College St. Paul (MN)
 1992 Northland College
 1993 Concordia College Seward (NE)
 1994 (Not available)
 1995 Kansas Wesleyan University
 1996 Kansas Wesleyan University
 1997 Kansas Wesleyan University
 1998 Rochester College
 1999 Rochester College
 2000 Florida College
 2001 University of Dallas
 2002 Southern Virginia University
 2003 Florida College
 2004 Southern Virginia University
 2005 Florida College
 2006 Florida College
 2007 Florida College
 2008 Spalding University
 2009 Florida College
 2010 Florida College
 2011 Florida College
 2012 Daemen College
 2013 Daemen College
 2014 Florida College
 2015 Florida College
 2016 Florida College
 2017 Florida College

Women's Division I volleyball
 2018 Florida National University
 2019 Florida National University
 2020 No tournament
 2021 Saint Mary-of-the-Woods College
 2022 Bluefield State University

Women's Division II volleyball
 2018 Johnson & Wales University (NC)
 2019 Penn State Fayette
 2020 No tournament
 2021 UC Clermont
 2022 Penn State Mont Alto

Men's basketball
 1967 Sullivan Business College
 1968 Sullivan Business College
 1969 Sullivan Business College
 1970 Kittrell College (NC)
 1971 Tiffin University (OH)
 1972 Lindsey Wilson College (KY)
 1973 Tiffin University
 1974 Bryant & Stratton Institute
 1975 Florida College
 1976 Northeast Technical College (?)
 1977 Rust College (MS)
 1978 Southern Union (AL)
 1979 Florida College
 1980 Sullivan Junior College (formerly Sullivan Business College)
 1981 Oakland City College (IN)
 1982 Blackburn College (IL)
 1983 Concordia College (TX)
 1984 Webber College
 1985 Blackburn College (IL)
 1986 Bristol College
 1987 National College of Business (SD)
 1988 National College
 1989 Michigan Christian College
 1990 Paul Quinn College (TX)
 1991 Mount Senario College (WI)
 1992 Texas College
 1993 Texas College
 1994 Mount Senario College
 1995 Paul Quinn College
 1996 Mount Senario College
 1997 Louisiana Christian University
 1998 Northwest Christian College
 1999 Northwest Christian College
 2000 Kansas Wesleyan University

Division I men's basketball
 2001 Finlandia University (MI)
 2002 The Apprentice School
 2003 The Apprentice School
 2004 Rochester College
 2005 Rochester College
 2006 Rhema Bible Training Center
 2007 Rhema Bible Training Center
 2008 Oakwood University
 2009 Talladega College
 2010 Talladega College
 2011 Southern Virginia University
 2012 Oakwood University
 2013 Rochester College
 2014 Washington Adventist University
 2015 Daemen College
 2016 Oakwood University
 2017 Concordia College (AL)
 2018 Rochester College
 2019 Oakwood University
 2020 No tournament
 2021 No tournament
 2022 Paul Quinn College
 2023 Salem University

Men's Division II basketball
 2001 Huntingdon College (AL)
 2002 Central Maine Community College
 2003 Johnson & Wales University (FL)
 2004 Arkansas Baptist College
 2005 New Hampshire Technical Institute
 2006 Taylor University, Ft. Wayne
 2007 University of Cincinnati Clermont College
 2008 Williamson Trade College
 2009 Williamson Trade College
 2010 World Harvest Bible College
 2011 Andrews University
 2012 Andrews University
 2013 Warren Wilson College
 2014 Andrews University
 2015 Berkeley College (NY)
 2016 Berkeley College (NY)
 2017 Berkeley College (NY)
 2018 Berkeley College (NY)
 2019 Penn State Wilkes-Barre
 2020 NHTI, Concord's Community College
 2021 No tournament
 2022 Southern Maine Community College

Women's basketball
 1980 Colorado Women's College
 1981 No tournament
 1982 National (SD)
 1983 Concordia St. Paul (MN)
 1984 Lamar Community College
 1985 Phillips Junior College-Gulfport
 1986 Phillips Junior College-Gulfport
 1987 Concordia (NE)
 1988 College of St. Scholastica (MN)
 1989 Concordia (NE)
 1990 Concordia (NE)
 1991 Silver Lake College (WI)
 1992 Trinity International University (IL)
 1993 Blackburn College (IL)
 1994 Trinity International
 1995 Martin Methodist College
 1996 Kansas Wesleyan University
 1997 Kansas Wesleyan University
 1998 Clarendon College
 1999 Kansas Wesleyan University
 2000 Southern Virginia University
 2001 The Apprentice School
 2002 The Apprentice School
 2003 Mount Aloysius (Pa.)
 2004 Presentation College (S.D.)
 2005 Southern Virginia University
 2006 Southern Virginia University
 2007 Concordia College - Selma
 2008 Concordia College - Selma
 2009 Spalding University
 2010 Talladega College
 2011 Ave Maria University
 2012 Concordia College - Selma

Women's Division I basketball
 2013 Daemen College
 2014 Concordia College Alabama
 2015 Daemen College
 2016 Concordia College Alabama
 2017 Concordia College Alabama
 2018 Rochester College
 2019 Mississippi University for Women
 2020 Tournament canceled
 2021 No tournament
 2022 D'Youville University

Women's Division II basketball
 2013 Albany College of Pharmacy
 2014 University of Cincinnati Clermont College
 2015 Penn State Beaver
 2016 College of St. Joseph
 2017 Central Maine Community College
 2018 Johnson & Wales University (NC)
 2019 Central Maine Community College
 2020 Penn State Beaver
 2021 No tournament
 2022 Central Maine Community College

Baseball
 1975 Colorado Northwestern Community College
 1976 Colorado Northwestern Community College
 1977 Colorado Northwestern Community College
 1978 Missouri Baptist College
 1979 Colorado Northwestern Community College
 1980 Colorado Northwestern Community College
 1981 Colorado Northwestern Community College
 1982 Alabama Christian College
 1983 Lamar College
 1984 Lamar College
 1985 Colorado Northwestern Community College
 1986 Colorado Northwestern Community College
 1987 No tournament
 1988 Kansas Wesleyan University
 1989 (Not available)
 1990 Bristol University
 1991-1994 (Not available)
 1995 (Not available)
 1996 Baptist Christian College
 1997 Kansas Wesleyan University
 1998 No tournament
 1999 Kansas Wesleyan University
 2000 Huntingdon College (AL)
 2001 (Not available)
 2002 Florida College
 2003 LaGrange College (GA)
 2004 Florida College
 2005 Webber International University
 2006 Briarcliffe College
 2007 The Apprentice School
 2008 Columbia Union College
 2009 Saint Catharine College
 2010 Briarcliffe College
 2011 Briarcliffe College
 2012 Spalding University
 2013 University of Cincinnati Clermont College
 2014 Lindenwood University – Belleville
 2015 The Apprentice School
 2016 College of St. Joseph
 2017 College of St. Joseph
 2018 Penn State DuBois
 2019 Penn State DuBois
 2020 Tournament canceled
 2021 Penn State DuBois
 2022 The Apprentice School

Men's golf
 1972 University of South Carolina-Aiken
 1973 Steed College (TN)
 1974 University of South Carolina Spartanburg
 1975 University of South Carolina Aiken
 1976 University of South Carolina Aiken
 1977 Ambassador College (TX)
 1978 Southern Union College (AL)
 1979 Florida College
 1980 Brewer State College (AL)
 1981-2000 (Not available)
 2001-2002 No tournament
 2003 LaGrange College
 2004 Keystone College
 2005 The Apprentice School
 2006 The Apprentice School
 2007 Rhema Bible College
 2008 Pennsylvania College of Technology
 2009 Rochester College
 2010 Rochester College
 2011 Lindenwood University – Belleville
 2012 Daemen College
 2013 Daemen College
 2014 Daemen College
 2015 Cleary University
 2016 Bluefield State College
 2017 SUNY Delhi
 2018 Saint Mary-of-the-Woods College
 2019 Saint Mary-of-the-Woods College
 2020 No tournament
 2021 Bluefield State College
 2022 Johnson & Wales University (NC)

Softball
 1991 Lake Erie College (OH)
 1992-1996 (Not available)
 1997 Saint Mary-of-the-Woods College (IN)
 1998 No tournament
 1999 Southern Virginia College
 2000 Saint Mary-of-the-Woods College
 2001 (Not available)
 2002 Saint Mary-of-the-Woods College
 2003 Saint Mary-of-the-Woods College
 2004 Saint Mary-of-the-Woods College
 2005 Saint Mary-of-the-Woods College
 2006 Robert Morris–Springfield
 2007 Saint Mary-of-the-Woods College
 2008 Saint Mary-of-the-Woods College
 2009 Saint Catharine College
 2010 Robert Morris–Springfield
 2011 Rochester College
 2012 Spalding University
 2013 Lindenwood University – Belleville
 2014 Lindenwood University – Belleville
 2015 Saint Mary-of-the-Woods College
 2016 Saint Mary-of-the-Woods College
 2017 Saint Mary-of-the-Woods College
 2018 Cleary University
 2019 Saint Mary-of-the-Woods College
 2020 Tournament canceled
 2021 Florida National University
 2022 Florida National University

See also
 List of USCAA institutions
 NCAA
 National Association of Intercollegiate Athletics (NAIA)
 National Christian College Athletic Association (NCCAA)
 National Junior College Athletic Association (NJCAA)
 California Community College Athletic Association (CCCAA)

References

External links
 

 
1966 establishments in the United States
Organizations based in Newport News, Virginia
Sports organizations established in 1966
College sports governing bodies in the United States